The 25th annual Cannes Film Festival was held from 4 to 19 May 1972. The Palme d'Or went to the Italian films The Working Class Goes to Heaven by Elio Petri and The Mattei Affair by Francesco Rosi.

The festival opened with the French film L'aventure, c'est l'aventure by Claude Lelouch and closed with the British film Frenzy by Alfred Hitchcock.

Jury 
The following people were appointed as the Jury of the 1972 feature film competition:

Feature films
Joseph Losey (UK) Jury President
Bibi Andersson (Sweden)
Georges Auric (France)
Erskine Caldwell (USA)
Mark Donskoi (Soviet Union)
Miloš Forman (USA)
Giorgio Papi (Yugoslavia)
Jean Rochereau (France) (journalist)
Alain Tanner (Switzerland)
Naoki Togawa (Japan)
Short films
Frédéric Rossif (France) President
Istvan Dosai (Hungary) (Cinématographie official)
Vicente Pineda (Italy) (journalist)

Official selection

In competition - Feature film
The following feature films competed for the Palme d'Or:

Dear Louise (Chère Louise) by Philippe de Broca
A Fan's Notes by Eric Till
Havoc (Das Unheil) by Peter Fleischmann
Hearth Fires (Les Feux de la Chandeleur) by Serge Korber
I Love You Rosa (Ani Ohev Otach Rosa) by Moshé Mizrahi
Images by Robert Altman
Jeremiah Johnson by Sydney Pollack
King, Queen, Knave by Jerzy Skolimowski
Malpertuis by Harry Kümel
The Mattei Affair (Il Caso Mattei) by Francesco Rosi
Oil Lamps (Petrolejové lampy) by Juraj Herz
Pearl in the Crown (Perła w koronie) by Kazimierz Kutz
Red Psalm (Még kér a nép) by Miklós Jancsó
The Ruling Class by Peter Medak
The Seduction of Mimi (Mimí metallurgico ferito nell'onore) by Lina Wertmüller
Silence (Chinmoku) by Masahiro Shinoda
Slaughterhouse-Five by George Roy Hill
Solaris (Solyaris) by Andrei Tarkovsky
The Surveyors (Les arpenteurs) by Michel Soutter
To Find a Man by Buzz Kulik
Trotta by Johannes Schaaf
The True Nature of Bernadette (La vraie nature de Bernadette) by Gilles Carle
The Visitors by Elia Kazan
We Won't Grow Old Together (Nous ne vieillirons pas ensemble) by Maurice Pialat
The Working Class Goes to Heaven (La classe operaia va in paradiso) by Elio Petri

Films out of competition
The following films were selected to be screened out of competition:

 Asta Nielsen by Asta Nielsen
 Bröder Carl by Susan Sontag
 Faustine et le bel été by Nina Companéez
 Frenzy by Alfred Hitchcock
 L'aventure c'est l'aventure by Claude Lelouch
 La dérive by Paula Delsol
 La Génération du désert by Nicole Stéphane
 Une guerre pour une paix by Nicole Stéphane
 Lisa and the Devil by Mario Bava
 Den gale dansker by Kirsten Stenbæk
 Le lys de mer by Jacqueline Audry
 Hvezda Betlémská by Hermína Týrlová
 Alye maki Issyk-Kulya by Bolotbek Shamshiyev
 Les Jeunes Filles En Fleurs by David Hamilton, Philippe Leroi
 Macbeth by Roman Polanski
 Marie by Márta Mészáros
 Merry-Go-Round by Kirsten Stenbæk
 Papa, les petits bateaux by Nelly Kaplan
 Roma by Federico Fellini
 Serata by Malvina Ursianu
 Sziget a szárazföldön by Judit Elek

Short film competition
The following short films competed for the Short Film Palme d'Or:

Atlantyda by Piotr Szpakowicz
The Birth of Aphrodite by Leland Auslender
Le Fusil à lunette by Jean Chapot
Giovanni Michelucci by Fernando Cerchio
Hundertwasser's Rainy Day by Peter Schamoni
Jour de classe by Henri Jouf
Magic Graz by Curt M. Faudon
Malka dnevna muzika by Ivan Vesselinov
Mini by Stoian Doukov
I Omorfia tou thanatou by Nestoras Matsas
Operation X-70 by Raoul Servais
Pour solde de tout compte by Louis Pitzele
Een Zeer zonnige wereld by Pieter De Groot
Zikkaron by Laurent Coderre

Parallel sections

International Critics' Week
The following feature films were screened for the 11th International Critics' Week (11e Semaine de la Critique):

 Avoir 20 ans dans les Aurès by René Vautier (France)
 Fritz the Cat by Ralph Bakshi (United States)
 The Hamburg Uprising of 1923 (Der Hamburger Aufstand Oktober 1923) by Reiner Etz, Gisela Tuchtenhagen, Klaus Wildenhahn (West Germany)
 Dirty Money (La Maudite Galette) by Denys Arcand (Canada)
 Pilgrimage by Beni Montreso (United States)
 The Trial of Catonsville Nine by Gorgon Davidson (United States)
 Winter Soldier (Anonymous) (United States)
 Prata Palomares by André Faria (Brazil) (screening was canceled at the request of the Brazilian government)

Directors' Fortnight
The following films were screened for the 1972 Directors' Fortnight (Quinzaine des Réalizateurs):

 Alianza para el progreso by Julio César Ludueña (Argentina)
 All the Advantages by Christopher Mason (United Kingdom)
 The Birch Wood (Brzezina) by Andrzej Wajda (Poland)
 Confessions Among Actresses (Kokuhakuteki joyûron) by Yoshishige Yoshida (Japan)
 The Days of Water (Los días del agua) by Manuel Octavio Gómez (Cuba)
 Diary of a Suicide (Le journal d'un suicidé) by Stanislav Stanojevic (France)
 Los dias del amor by Alberto Isaac (Mexico)
 The Dupes (Al-makhdu'un) by Tewfik Saleh (Syria)
 Emitai by Ousmane Sembene (Senegal)
 Family Life by Ken Loach (United Kingdom)
 Film Portrait [doc.) by Jerome Hill (United States)
 Il gesto by Marcello Grottesi (Italy)
 Hail by Fred Levinson (United States)
 Heat by Paul Morrissey (United States)
 Homolka a tobolka by Jaroslav Papoušek (Czechoslovakia)
 Land of Silence and Darkness (Land des Schweigens und der Dunkelheit) (doc.) by Werner Herzog (West Germany)
 Luminous Procuress by Steven Arnold (United States)
 Marjoe by Howard Smith, Sarah Kernochan (United States)
 The People by John Korty (United States)
 Postchi by Dariush Mehrjui (Iran)
 ¡Qué hacer! by Saul Landau, Raoul Ruiz, James Becket, Bill Yarhaus, Nina Serrano (Chile, United States)
 Reed: Insurgent Mexico (Reed, México insurgente) by Paul Leduc (Mexico)
 Le Sang by Jean-Daniel Pollet (France)
 São Bernardo by Leon Hirszman (Brazil)
 Savages by James Ivory (United Kingdom)
 Shura by Toshio Matsumoto (Japan)
 St. Michael Had a Rooster (San Michele aveva un gallo) by Paolo and Vittorio Taviani (Italy)
 Summer Soldiers by Hiroshi Teshigahara (Japan)
 La tecnica e il rito by Miklós Jancsó (Italy)
 Der Tod der Maria Malibran by Werner Schroeter (West Germany)
 Week-end à Sochaux by Groupe Medvedkine (France)
 Wezwanie by Wojciech Solarz (Poland)
 The Wise Guys (Les smattes) by Jean-Claude Labrecque (Canada)
 Die Zelle by Horst Bienek (West Germany)

Short films

 Autoportrait d'un pornographe by Robert Swaim (France)
 Camille ou la comédie catastrophique by Claude Miller (France)
 Celui qui venait d'ailleurs by Atahualpa Lichy, J.P. Torok (France)
 Das Kaputte Kino by H.H.K. Schoenherr (Switzerland)
 Death of a Sandwichman by G. Henderickx, Robbe De Hert (Belgium)
 Drug Abuse by Pat Lehman (United States)
 Empereur Tomato-Ketchup by Shuji Terayama (Japan)
 Homo Augens by Ante Zaninovic (Yougoslavie)
 Kamasutra Rides Again by Bob Godfrey (United Kingdom)
 La Chute by Paul Dopff (France)
 Le Cabot by P. Letellier J. (France)
 Le Sourire by Paul Dopff (France)
 Légendes et chateaux by Patrick Hella (Belgium)
 Luger by Georges Bensoussan (France)
 Saint-Denis sur Avenir by Sarah Maldoror (France)
 Yunbogi no nikki by Nagisa Oshima (Japan)

Awards

Official awards
The following films and people received the 1972 Official selection awards:
Grand Prix du Festival International du Film:
The Working Class Goes to Heaven (La classe operaia va in paradiso) by Elio Petri
The Mattei Affair (Il Caso Mattei) by Francesco Rosi
Grand Prix Spécial du Jury: Solaris (Solyaris) by Andrei Tarkovsky
Best Director: Miklós Jancsó for Red Psalm (Még kér a nép)
Best Actress: Susannah York for Images
Best Actor: Jean Yanne for We Won't Grow Old Together (Nous ne vieillirons pas ensemble)
Jury Prize: Slaughterhouse-Five by George Roy Hill
Short films
Grand Prix International du Festival: Le Fusil à lunette by Jean Chapot
Prix spécial du Jury: Operation X-70 by Raoul Servais

Independent awards
FIPRESCI
FIPRESCI Prize: Avoir 20 ans dans les Aurès by René Vautier
Commission Supérieure Technique
Technical Grand Prize: Zikkaron by Laurent Coderre
Other awards
Special Mention: Gian Maria Volonté for  La Classe operaia va in paradiso and Il Caso Mattei

References

Media

INA: Atmosphere at the 1972 Festival (commentary in French)
INA: Groucho Marx and Alfred Hitchcock at Cannes (interview in French and English)
INA: Présentation du film "Malpertuis" (commentary in French)
INA: The winners (commentary in French)

External links 
1972 Cannes Film Festival (web.archive)
Official website Retrospective 1972
Cannes Film Festival Awards for 1972 at Internet Movie Database

Cannes Film Festival, 1972
Cannes Film Festival, 1972
Cannes Film Festival